Miss Universe Spain 2013 was the very first edition of the Miss Universe Spain pageant. It was held in the Convention Center at the Hotel Ada Palace in Madrid on 11 September 2013, exclusively for selecting the Spanish representative to Miss Universe 2013 as a result of the discontinuation of the traditional Miss Spain pageant which was last held in 2011.

Beating 11 other finalists, the winner was Patricia Yurena Rodríguez, a former Miss Spain 2008 winner and Miss World 2008 semi-finalist. She eventually placed as the first runner-up at the Miss Universe 2013 pageant.

Results

Special awards 
Miss Photogenic - Patricia Yurena Rodríguez
Miss Congeniality (voted by the contestants) - Kaira Cabrera
Miss Rostro - Sara Niño
Best National Costume - Patricia Yurena Rodríguez

Delegates

References 

Miss Spain
2013 in Spain
2013 in Madrid
2013 beauty pageants